A nanocrystal is a material particle having at least one dimension smaller than 100 nanometres, based on quantum dots (a nanoparticle) and composed of atoms in either a single- or poly-crystalline arrangement.

The size of nanocrystals distinguishes them from larger crystals. For example, silicon nanocrystals can provide efficient light emission while bulk silicon does
not and may be used for memory components.

When embedded in solids, nanocrystals may exhibit much more complex melting behaviour than conventional solids and may form the basis of a special class of solids. They can behave as single-domain systems (a volume within the system having the same atomic or molecular arrangement throughout) that can help explain the behaviour of macroscopic samples of a similar material without the complicating presence of grain boundaries and other defects.

Semiconductor nanocrystals having dimensions smaller than 10 nm are also described as quantum dots.

Synthesis
The traditional method involves molecular precursors, which can include typical metal salts and a source of the anion.  Most semiconducting nanomaterials feature chalcogenides (SS−, SeS−, TeS−) and pnicnides (P3−, As3−, Sb3−).  Sources of these elements are the silylated derivatives such as bis(trimethylsilyl)sulfide (S(SiMe3)2 and tris(trimethylsilyl)phosphine (P(SiMe3)3).

Some procedures use surfactants to solubilize the growing nanocrystals.  In some cases, nanocrystals can exchange their elements with reagents through atomic diffusion.

Applications

Filter
Nanocrystals made with zeolite are used to filter crude oil into diesel fuel at an ExxonMobil oil refinery in Louisiana at a cost less than conventional methods.

Wear resistance
Nanocrystals' level of hardness is closer to the optimized molecular hardness which attracts the wear resistance industry

See also
 Cadmium telluride nanocrystals
 Magnetic nanoparticles
 Nanocrystal solar cell
 Nanocrystalline silicon
 Nanoparticle
 Quantum dot

References

External links

 Elan Drug Technology
 Nanocrystalline Soft Magnetic Materials
 Jose-Yacaman article on gold/silver nanocrystals 

Nanomaterials
Quantum dots
Zeolites